Ronit Lentin (born 25 October 1944) is an Israeli political sociologist and a writer of fiction and non-fiction books.

Life
Lentin was born in Haifa, Mandatory Palestine, in 1944: she has lived in Ireland since 1969. A political sociologist, she was an associate professor of sociology at Trinity College, Dublin until her retirement in 2014. From 1997 until 2012 Lentin was the director of the MPhil in Race, Ethnicity, Conflict, Department of Sociology. She was head of the Department of Sociology and a founder member of the Trinity Immigration Initiative, Trinity College, Dublin.
Lentin has published extensively on Palestine and Israel, racism and immigration in Ireland, and on gender and genocide and the Holocaust.

Lentin has advocated an open-door immigration policy for Ireland and opposes all deportations.

Lentin is an activist for Palestinian liberation and for the Palestinian right of return. She supports a one-state solution to the Israeli-Palestinian conflict; "one democratic state in historic Palestine where Palestinians, Jews and migrants live in full equality".

Research fields
Racism and immigration in Ireland; Israeli–Palestinian conflict; gender and genocide / violence; feminism.

Books and publications
Interviews: Conversations with Palestinian Women (Jerusalem: Mifras 1982)
Tea with Mrs. Klein in Triad: Modern Irish Fiction (Dublin: Wolfhound Press 1986)
Night Train to Mother (Dublin: Attic Press 1989) 
Songs on the Death of Children (Dublin: Poolbeg Press 1996)
Israel and the Daughters of the Shoah: Reoccupying the Territories of Silence (Oxford and NY: Berghahn Books 2000) 
Gender and Catastrophe(London: Zed Books 1997)Editor 
(Re)searching Women: Feminist Research Methodologies in the Social Sciences in Ireland (Dublin: IPA 2000) co-editor, with Anne Byrne.
Racism and Anti-racism in Ireland (Belfast: Beyond the Pale 2002) co-editor, with Robbie McVeigh, 
Women and the Politics of Military Confrontation: Palestinian and Israeli Gendered Narratives of Dislocation (Oxford and NY: Berghahn Books 2002) co-editor, with Nahla Abdo. 
Women’s Movement: Migrant Women Transforming Ireland(2003) co-editor, with Eithne Luibhéid.
Re-presenting the Shoah for the 21st Century(Oxford and NY: Berghahn Books. 2004), editor.
After Optimism? Ireland, Racism and Globalisation (Dublin: Metroeireann Publications. 2006) with Robbie McVeigh. 
Race and State (Newcastle: Cambridge Scholars Press. 2006) co-editor, with Alana Lentin. 
Performing Global Networks (Newcastle: Cambridge Scholars Publishing 2007) co-editor, with Karen Fricker
Thinking Palestine (London: Zed Books, 2008) editor
Co-memory and Melancholia: Israelis Memorialising the Palestinian Nakba (Manchester: Manchester University Press, 2010, paperback 2014

Migrant Activism and Integration from Below in Ireland ( Palgrave-Macmillan, 2013) co-editor, with Elena Moreo
 Traces of Racial Exception: Racializing Israeli Settler Colonialism (Bloomsbury Academic, 2018)
 'Enforcing Silence: Academic Freedom, Palestine and the Criticism of Israel (Zed Books, 2020), co-editor with David Landy and Conor McCarthy
 'Disavowing Asylum: Documenting Ireland's Asylum Industrial Complex (Rowman and Littlefield, 2021), with Vukasin Nedljkovic

References

External links
Ireland: A Racist State?    Interview with Ronit Lentin

Living people
Irish Jews
Irish sociologists
Immigrants to Ireland
Israeli people of Romanian-Jewish descent
Israeli Jews
Israeli sociologists
People from Haifa
1944 births
20th-century Irish people
21st-century Irish people
Political sociologists
Jewish feminists
Israeli feminists
Women political scientists